Shane Mark Williams,  (born 26 February 1977) is a Welsh rugby union player most famous for his long and successful tenure as a wing for the Ospreys and the Wales national team. He also played scrum-half on occasion. Williams is the record try scorer for Wales, and is fourth on the international list of leading rugby union test try scorers behind Daisuke Ohata, Bryan Habana and David Campese. He is Wales's most capped winger and is considered to be one of the greatest wingers of all time.

In 2008, Williams was selected as the World Rugby Player of the Year, then known as the IRB Player of the Year.

Since his retirement from international rugby in 2012, Williams has worked as a presenter on S4C's Six Nations rugby programme Y Clwb Rygbi Rhyngwladol, and as a pundit on BBC, ITV and Channel 4 broadcasts as well as third party shows such as "Inside Welsh Rugby", commenting on the grassroots of Welsh rugby. Williams was selected to the Barbarians squad that played Wales in June 2012. It was originally planned to be his last appearance as a player, but he shortly thereafter signed a one-year contract to play in Japan with Mitsubishi Sagamihara DynaBoars in June 2012. Williams was appointed Member of the Order of the British Empire (MBE) in the 2012 Birthday Honours for services to rugby.
Williams extended his stay in Japan several times, taking on a role as player-coach and turning down an offer from French Top 14 side Toulon in the process. Before finally announcing he would be returning home at the end of the 2014–15 Japanese Top League season.

In November 2016, Williams was inducted into the World Rugby Hall of Fame during opening ceremonies for the Hall's first physical home in Rugby, Warwickshire.

Early life 
Williams was born in Morriston in Swansea, but grew up in Glanamman in the Amman Valley. He picked up his first rugby ball while still in primary school, and was always small for his age, even going into secondary school at Amman Valley Comprehensive School (now Ysgol Dyffryn Aman). Told that he was too small to play rugby, Williams took up football instead, playing for Cwmamman United A.F.C.; in his first appearance for the club's junior team, Williams had to play in goal as no one else would volunteer to take the position. Williams' former junior football coach, Alun Rees, remembers him as a "superb goalkeeper", but notes that he could also play outfield. Williams played for Cwmamman United up to the senior level, while only playing rugby sporadically, and admits that, at the time, football was "[his] main sport". However, on the day of Cwmamman United's cup final, Williams was invited to play rugby with his friends at Amman United RFC; Amman United ended up winning by 82 points, with Williams scoring five tries.

Club career 
Williams started his junior career as a scrum-half at Amman United he joined Neath as a second-choice scrum-half. However, it became apparent to Lyn Jones, Neath's then-coach, that Williams simply could not be left out of the side, and placed him on the right wing, opposite Delme Williams on the left. However, Delme Williams had shown a tendency not to kick and chase the ball, resulting in him and Shane swapping wings.

When it came to Williams signing his first professional contract with Neath, Amman United demanded a transfer fee for him, resulting in negotiations between the two clubs. Nevertheless, Williams eventually signed for Neath on a contract worth approximately £7,500 per annum, equivalent to his wage at the local Job Centre where he was working part-time.

In his final Ospreys match at the Liberty Stadium he finished his career there in a similar style as he did with Wales scoring a try past the 80-minute mark and converted his own try for his final bow at the Liberty. Williams then, in his last game of professional club rugby, scored 2 tries for the Ospreys in the PRO12 final 30–31 win against Leinster. This included one in the 78th minute to give Dan Biggar what proved to be the winning conversion.

Williams planned to retire from rugby and join Ospreys' backroom staff, but received an offer to play one season in Japan with Mitsubishi Sagamihara DynaBoars, in the second division of the Japanese league system. The Ospreys gave him their blessing for the move, and he took up his staff role with that club upon the expiry of his Japanese contract.

He officially retired from playing at the end of the 2013/14 season, although he returned to play for his home village club, Amman United during the 2016 – 2017 season, including a try-scoring appearance in the 2017 WRU Bowl final at the Millennium Stadium. He now works as a commentator and pundit.

International career 
Williams was awarded his first cap for Wales by Graham Henry as a replacement against France in the 2000 Six Nations season, he was three weeks short of his 23rd birthday and weighed a little over 11 stone. He scored in his first full start for Wales with a try against Italy in the same Six Nations tournament and went on to score a total of 60 international tries (58 for Wales, 2 for the British & Irish Lions). Williams is also Wales' record try scorer in Six Nations Championships with 22 and Wales' record try scorer in Rugby World Cups with 10. In addition, he has scored six tries for the Lions in tour games, five of which were in one game.

He suffered a series of hamstring injuries in 2002 and did not often figure in Steve Hansen's squad. He considered quitting rugby entirely at this time.

He was taken to the 2003 Rugby World Cup in Australia as a third choice scrum half. He was selected in the final group game against New Zealand as Wales made numerous changes to their starting fifteen. It was in this game and the following against England that he really showed his world class potential and ensured that he would be a first choice winger for Wales from this point onwards.

He was part of the Grand Slam-winning Wales side in the 2005 Six Nations Championship, where he scored tries against Italy, Scotland, and most famously England, the try that helped them achieve a famous 11–9 victory that got their campaign underway. He was then selected to the British & Irish Lions for their 2005 New Zealand tour. On 28 June, he equalled a single-game Lions record by scoring five tries in a tour match against Manawatu.

In the summer of 2007, Williams underwent elbow and shoulder surgery and missed the tour of Australia. However, he did return in time to play the last Rugby World Cup warm up game against France.
During the 2007 Rugby World Cup, Williams earned his 50th cap against Japan. He scored two tries in that match, temporarily putting him on top of the 2007 Rugby World Cup try-scoring table with a total of five tries. The tries also put him above Ieuan Evans on the all-time Wales try scoring list, trailing only Gareth Thomas at that time. His try against France in their 2008 Six Nations Championship decider on 15 March 2008 placed him joint eighth on the all-time test try scoring list with Thomas, and surpassed Thomas on the all-time Wales try scoring list.

He participated in a second Grand Slam win with Wales in the 2008 Six Nations Championship, when he scored tries against Scotland (twice), Italy (twice), Ireland, and France, breaking the record on the all-time Wales try scoring list in the championship's final match against France, when he scored his 41st try for Wales. This try resulted in his father Mark Williams winning £25,000 from a £50 bet placed almost 10 years previously that he'd one day become Wales' leading try scorer. His performances in the Six Nations led to him being named the player of the tournament.

On 23 November 2008, Williams became the first Welshman to be named IRB Player of the Year, beating fellow Welshman Ryan Jones, New Zealand's Dan Carter, Scotland captain Mike Blair, and Italy captain Sergio Parisse.  On 7 December 2008, he won the BBC Cymru Wales Sports Personality of the Year, seeing off the competition of Tom James, David Roberts, Geraint Thomas and runners up Joe Calzaghe and Nicole Cooke.

In his first 2009 Six Nations game against Scotland he scored his 45th test try to take him above Jeff Wilson on the all-time leading try scorers list to sixth. During the game he received an ankle injury and was taken off the pitch. Following the injury he missed the next game against England, but would start for Wales' third game against France. In the fourth game of the championship, Williams scored Wales' opening try against Italy to take himself to equal fifth on the all-time leading try scorers list.

On 21 April 2009, Williams was named as a member of the British & Irish Lions for the 2009 tour to South Africa. Williams missed out on a starting place in the first two Tests but was selected to play in the final Test where he produced a man-of-the-match winning performance and scored two tries that contributed to the 28–9 victory over the Springboks.

On 21 November 2009, Williams scored two tries in Wales' comfortable 33–16 win over Argentina in the Millennium Stadium, taking his international try tally to 50.

On 13 February 2010, Williams scored the winning try against Scotland in Cardiff, completing a remarkable Welsh comeback. Wales trailed 24–14 with 4 minutes remaining in the game, and Williams' try on the last play of the game took the final score to 31–24 to Wales. It was Williams' 49th international try for Wales (51st in all internationals), and his 18th in the Six Nations, equalling the record by a Welshman in the tournament, held by Gareth Edwards.

On 26 February 2010, Williams again scored in the final minute in the 26–20 loss to France. This score handed him sole position of tries scored by a Welshman in the tournament with 19 tries for his country. He would subsequently increase his Six Nations tally to 22 tries.

He was a part of the 2011 Rugby World Cup squad in New Zealand and scored three tries. One of them being scored in the quarter final against Ireland in Wellington. Wales reached the semi-finals.

Williams stated that he would retire from playing for Wales after the 2011 Rugby World Cup but later decided to play against Australia on 3 December 2011. Williams' last Wales match ended in him scoring a final try to round off his glittering career. He scored his 58th try with the very last touch of his international career in added time as the game finished 24–18 to Australia. He said that wearing the Welsh jersey was the "best feeling ever".

In 2013 Williams was heading out to Australia to commentate on the British & Irish Lions test games. On 15 June 2013, Williams was called up to the Lions squad to face the ACT Brumbies.

Personal life 
In August 2005, a holiday to Cyprus made the headlines when Williams was erroneously held over an assault. The police lost his passport; his lawyer described the whole incident as a "total stitch-up"; and on his return to the United Kingdom, Williams suggested that he should have spent his holiday in Tenby instead.

On 23 December 2005, Williams married his childhood sweetheart, Gail Branwen Lacey, whom he had met at Amman Valley School 14 years previously, at Twyn Church in Garnant. The couple's first daughter, Georgie, was born on 7 November 2006. The couple later had a son, Carter, born 11 July 2009.

Points record 

Statistics as of 3 May 2008, taken from the official site of the Ospreys, as of 22 April 2012 taken from the official site of the Welsh Rugby Union and the British & Irish Lions.

Television appearances 
Williams has appeared numerous times in Welsh language television programmes on S4C. He was green gunged with swimmer David Davies in the Crawfr children's television programme and in 2011 has appeared in Clwb Rygbi Shane.

In 2012, Williams made a cameo appearance as himself in an episode of the UK TV comedy drama Stella.

In February 2012, Williams joined the team of BBC Wales pundits, covering the Six Nations. In 2012 he had a TV appearance on BBC2 showing his careers beginning with his gymnastics in Amman Valley School where he was played by 15-year-old Jonathan Coleman. He proceeded to give Jonathan a signed shirt for him taking his time to perform for the film crew for his television programme.

As part of a job-swap documentary for Irish television broadcast on 1 March 2017, Williams trained for and played Gaelic football for Glenswilly; in return, Michael Murphy was sent to train with French rugby club Clermont Auvergne. Williams scored four points (three from play) on his debut for the club in January, playing as full forward. He continued to maintain the links he had established with the club.

BBC One Wales aired a documentary in 2017 called Shane – For the love of the game. This documentary followed Williams as he went to work with his family firm, tried new sports and attempted to build a life without rugby.

References

External links 
Shane Williams' details on the Ospreys website
Wales profile
Scrum.com's page
Yahoo Sports page
Rick O'Shea visits Shane Williams's home club – TV segment on his early days with Amman United RFC

1977 births
Living people
Barbarian F.C. players
British & Irish Lions rugby union players from Wales
British expatriates in Japan
Expatriate rugby union players in Japan
Gaelic football forwards
Members of the Order of the British Empire
Mitsubishi Sagamihara DynaBoars players
Neath RFC players
Ospreys (rugby union) players
People educated at Ysgol Dyffryn Aman
Rugby union players from Morriston
Rugby union wings
Rugby union players from Carmarthenshire
Wales international rugby union players
Welsh expatriate rugby union players
Welsh Gaelic footballers
World Rugby Awards winners
World Rugby Hall of Fame inductees
World Rugby Players of the Year